Events from the year 2007 in Brazil.

Incumbents

Federal government
 President: Luiz Inácio Lula da Silva 
 Vice President: José Alencar Gomes da Silva

Governors
 Acre: Jorge Viana (till 1 January); Binho Marques (from 1 January)
 Alagoas: Luís Abílio de Sousa Neto (till 1 January); Teotônio Vilela Filho (from 1 January)
 Amapa: Waldez Góes
 Amazonas: Eduardo Braga
 Bahia: Paulo Souto (till 1 January); Jaques Wagner (from 1 January)
 Ceará: Lúcio Alcântara (till 1 January); Cid Gomes (from 1 January)
 Espírito Santo: Paulo Hartung
 Goiás: Alcides Rodrigues
 Maranhão: José Reinaldo Tavares (till 1 January); Jackson Lago (starting 1 January)
 Mato Grosso: Blairo Maggi
 Mato Grosso do Sul: José Orcírio Miranda dos Santos
 Minas Gerais: Aécio Neves
 Pará: Simão Jatene (tiil 1 January); Ana Júlia Carepa (from 1 January)
 Paraíba: Cássio Cunha Lima
 Paraná: Hermas Eurides Brandão then Roberto Requião de Mello e Silva
 Pernambuco: Mendonça Filho (till 1 January); Eduardo Campos (from 1 January)
 Piauí: Wellington Dias
 Rio de Janeiro: Rosinha Garotinho then Sérgio Cabral Filho
 Rio Grande do Norte: Wilma Maria de Faria
 Rio Grande do Sul: Germano Rigotto (till 1 January), Yeda Rorato Crusius (from 1 January)
 Rondônia: Ivo Narciso Cassol
 Roraima: Ottomar de Sousa Pinto (till 11 December); José de Anchieta Júnior (from 14 December)
 Santa Catarina: Eduardo Moreira (till 1 January); Luiz Henrique da Silveira (from 1 January)
 São Paulo: Cláudio Lembo (till 1 January); José Serra (from 1 January)
 Sergipe: João Alves Filho (till 1 January); Marcelo Déda (from 1 January)
 Tocantins:	Marcelo Miranda

Vice governors
 Acre: Arnóbio Marques de Almeida Júnior (till 1 January); Carlos César Correia de Messias (from 1 January)
 Alagoas: Luís Abílio de Sousa Neto (till 1 January); José Wanderley Neto (from 1 January)
 Amapá: Pedro Paulo Dias de Carvalho 
 Amazonas: Omar José Abdel Aziz 
 Bahia: Eraldo Tinoco Melo (till 1 January); Edmundo Pereira Santos (from 1 January)
 Ceará: Francisco de Queiroz Maia Júnior (till 1 January); Francisco José Pinheiro (from 1 January)
 Espírito Santo: Wellington Coimbra (till 1 January); Ricardo de Rezende Ferraço (from 1 January)
 Goiás: Alcides Rodrigues Filho (till 1 January); Ademir de Oliveira Meneses (from 1 January)
 Maranhão: Jurandir Ferro do Lago Filho (till 1 January); Luís Carlos Porto (from 1 January)
 Mato Grosso: Iraci Araújo Moreira (till 1 January); Silval da Cunha Barbosa (from 1 January)
 Mato Grosso do Sul: Egon Krakheche (till 1 January); Murilo Zauith (from 1 January)
 Minas Gerais: Clésio Soares de Andrade (till 1 January); Antonio Augusto Junho Anastasia (from 1 January)
 Pará: Valéria Pires Franco (till 1 January); Odair Santos Corrêa (from 1 January)
 Paraíba: Lauremília Lucena (till 1 January); José Lacerda Neto (from 1 January)
 Paraná: Orlando Pessuti 
 Pernambuco: José Mendonça Bezerra Filho (till 1 January); João Soares Lyra Neto (from 1 January)
 Piauí: Osmar Ribeiro de Almeida Júnior (till 1 January); Wilson Martins (from 1 January)
 Rio de Janeiro: Luiz Paulo Conde (until 1 January), Luiz Fernando Pezão (starting 1 January)
 Rio Grande do Norte: Antônio Jácome (till 1 January); Iberê Ferreira (from 1 January)
 Rio Grande do Sul: Antônio Carlos Hohlfeldt (till 1 January); Paulo Afonso Girardi Feijó (from 1 January)
 Rondônia: Odaísa Fernandes Ferreira (till 1 January); João Aparecido Cahulla (from 1 January)
 Roraima: Erci de Moraes (till 1 January); José de Anchieta Júnior (from 1 January)
 Santa Catarina: Eduardo Pinho Moreira (till 1 January); Leonel Pavan (from 1 January)
 São Paulo: vacant (till 1 January); Alberto Goldman (from 1 January)
 Sergipe: Marília Mandarino (till 1 January); Belivaldo Chagas Silva (from 1 January)
 Tocantins: Raimundo Nonato Pires dos Santos (till 1 January); Paulo Sidnei Antunes (from 1 January)

Events

January

January 9 – YouTube is unblocked in Brazil as a São Paulo state court revises its ruling for Daniela Cicarelli video clips.

February

February 16 – The G8 countries, plus Brazil, China, India, Mexico and South Africa, approve the 'Washington Declaration,' proposing a global carbon emissions trading system to replace the Kyoto Protocol by 2009.

March

March 8 – U.S. president George W. Bush departs on a tour of Latin America that took him to Brazil, Uruguay, Colombia, Guatemala and Mexico. Upon arrival in São Paulo he is greeted with protest demonstrations.
March 18 – Cesare Battisti, convicted in absentia of two murders in Italy in the 1970s and who later became a crime writer in France, is arrested in Brazil.

April

April 11 – Trade officials from the United States, European Union, India and Brazil meet in New Delhi, India, to revive the World Trade Organization's Doha round of negotiations.
April 20 – The G4 group of nations, which includes Brazil, India, Germany and Japan, says that it would revive efforts for United Nations Security Council reform.

May

May 9 – Pope Benedict XVI arrives in Brazil on his first visit to Latin America to reaffirm Catholicism in the region.
May 10 – Pope Benedict XVI urges tens of thousands of young Brazilian Catholics packing the Pacaembu stadium in São Paulo to resist the temptations of wealth, power and other "snares of evil," and tells them to promote life from "its beginning to natural end."
May 11 – Pope Benedict XVI canonizes Brazil's first native-born saint, Frei Galvão, an 18th-century Franciscan friar.
May 22 – Silas Rondeau, the Energy Minister of Brazil, resigns over allegations of corruption in a public works project.

June

June 26 – Bolivia reclaims two oil refineries from Brazilian state-owned energy company Petrobras.

July

July 7 – The New Seven Wonders of the World are announced.  These are The Great Wall of China, Petra in Jordan, the Christ the Redeemer statue in Brazil, Machu Picchu in Peru, Mexico's Chichen Itza Mayan site, the Colosseum in Rome and the Taj Mahal in India.
July 7 – Live Earth gets underway with concerts in Australia, the United States, Germany, South Africa, the United Kingdom, Brazil, Japan and China.
July 10 – President Luiz Inácio Lula da Silva announces plans to build a nuclear-powered submarine to patrol the waters off Brazil's coast at a cost of US$500 million.
July 13 – The Fifteenth Pan American Games begin in Rio de Janeiro, Brazil.
July 15 – Brazil defeats Argentina 3-0 in the 2007 Copa América final.
July 17 – TAM Linhas Aéreas Flight 3054 carrying 186 people crashes in Congonhas International Airport, São Paulo, Brazil. The death toll is estimated to be at least 200 people.
July 20 – The President of Brazil Luiz Inácio Lula da Silva orders an inquiry into the crash of TAM Linhas Aéreas Flight 3054.
July 21 – A radar failure disrupts international air travel to Brazil causing disruption to thousands of travellers.
July 25 – The President of Brazil Luiz Inácio Lula da Silva removes Defense Minister Waldir Pires, who is responsible for civil aviation, from his Cabinet and replaces him with former Justice Minister Nelson Jobim after two major crashes in ten months.
July 29 – Approximately 5,000 Brazilians demonstrate in São Paulo over the recent crash of TAM Linhas Aéreas Flight 3054.

August

August 3 – Two Cuban boxers, Guillermo Rigondeaux Olympic bantamweight champion and amateur welterweight world champion Erislandi Lara, who deserted their team at the 2007 Pan American Games are found in Rio de Janeiro, Brazil and will be sent back to Cuba.
August 4 – Brazilian Defense Minister Nelson Jobim fires the head of the Brazilian airports authority, José Carlos Pereira for recent problems including the crash of TAM Linhas Aéreas Flight 3054 and hires Sergio Gaudenzi, the President of the Brazilian Space Agency.
August 6 – Mexico and Brazil sign an agreement on developing technology for oil and natural gas exploration and exploitation involving co-operation between Pemex and Petrobras.
August 7 – Juan Carlos Ramirez-Abadia, Colombian cocaine trafficker boss of the Norte del Valle Cartel is apprehended in Brazil and faces extradition to the United States. The US Government had offered a reward of US$5 million.
August 16 – The iBovespa falls by 3,500 points in the afternoon session on the São Paulo Stock Exchange. Brazil's stock market recorded its biggest one-day drop since the September 11, 2001 attacks.

September

September 3 – Tomás Medina Caracas (known by his nom de guerre "Negro Acacio"), one of FARC's most important leaders and the liaison between this Colombian guerrilla and Brazilian drug dealers, is killed in action by Colombian armed forces in Guaviare.
September 5 – A Congressional committee has voted to remove the President of the Senate of Brazil Renan Calheiros as a result of a corruption scandal.
September 24 – President Luiz Inácio Lula da Silva says that he will defend Brazil's record on global climate change when he addresses the United Nations General Assembly this week.
September 24 – Brazil's stock market rises to a record 58,393.75 points and the country's currency, the real, gains 0.11 percent to 1.867 per U.S. dollar.

October

 October 21 – Kimi Raikkonen wins the Brazilian Grand Prix and the Championship against Fernando Alonso and Lewis Hamilton.

November

November 4 – At least six people are killed as a Learjet 35 crashes into a residential district in São Paulo, Brazil.
November 25 – At least eight football fans die when part of the Fonte Nova stadium in Salvador de Bahia, Brazil, collapses.

December

December 2 – Brazil starts free-to-air digital television transmissions in São Paulo, but broadcasting companies must transmit signals in both analogue and digital formats until June 2016.
December 17 – The leaders of Brazil, Bolivia, and Chile agree to build a highway by 2009 that will link the Atlantic (in Santos, Brazil) and the Pacific (in Iquique, Chile) coasts of South America.
December 20 – The Portrait of Suzanne Bloch (1904), by the Spanish artist Pablo Picasso, and O Lavrador de Café by Brazilian modernist painter Cândido Portinari, are stolen from the São Paulo Museum of Art.

Deaths

February 4 – José Carlos Bauer, 81, World Cup footballer.
March 5 – Ivo Lorscheiter, 79, Catholic Bishop and advocate of liberation theology, multiple organ failure.
April 16 – Maria Lenk, 92, Olympic swimmer (1932, 1936), rupture of aortic aneurysm.
April 17 – Nair Bello, 75, actress, heart failure.
April 29 – Octavio Frias, 94, publishing magnate, kidney failure.
May 6 – Enéas Carneiro, 68, politician, leukemia.
June 1 – Marly de Oliveira, 69, poet ("O Mar de Permeio"), multiple organ failure.
July 17 – Paulo Rogério Amoretty Souza, 60, chairman of SCI, attorney for Corinthians, plane crash.
July 17 – Júlio Redecker, 51, leader of the Social Democracy Party, plane crash.
August 2 – Franco Dalla Valle, 62, Roman Catholic Bishop of Juína.
October 1 – Tetsuo Okamoto, 75, swimmer and Brazil's first Olympic swimming medallist (1952), respiratory failure.
October 8 – Constantine Andreou, 90, painter and sculptor.
October 12 – Paulo Autran, 85, actor, lung cancer.
October 26 – Hans Stern, 85, jeweler, founder of the company H. Stern.
December 9 – Rafael Sperafico, 26, racing driver, race crash.
December 11 – Ottomar Pinto, 76, politician, Governor of Roraima (2004–2007), heart attack.
December 15 – Ryan Gracie, 33, martial artist.
December 21 – Norton Nascimento, 45, actor, heart failure.
December 23 – Aloísio Lorscheider, 83, cardinal, heart failure.
December 24 – Cláudio Camunguelo, 60, composer and singer, diabetes.
December 27 – Prince Pedro Gastão of Orléans-Braganza, 94, pretender to the title Emperor of Brazil.
December 29 – Olayr Coan, 48, actor and theater director, car accident.

See also

 2007 in Brazilian football
 2007 in Brazilian television
 List of Brazilian films of 2007

References

 
2000s in Brazil
Years of the 21st century in Brazil
Brazil
Brazil